"Belong to the World" is a song by Canadian singer the Weeknd from his debut studio album Kiss Land (2013). The song was released as the album's second single on July 16, 2013.

Background and lyrics
On July 6, 2013, the Weeknd unveiled "Belong to the World" to the general public at the Mod Club Theatre in Toronto, Ontario, Canada. The song's lyrics revolve around falling in love with the wrong person and are about a serious relationship that the Weeknd once had.

Music video
The music video for "Belong to the World" was first released on July 15, 2013, via MTV. It was later uploaded to the Weeknd's Vevo account on YouTube the day following on July 16, 2013. The video is set in Japan and was directed by Anthony Mandler. It has so far been viewed over 20 million times.

Controversy
The song gained some controversy due to Geoff Barrow of Portishead accusing the Weeknd of allegedly sampling the drums used in their song "Machine Gun" without their permission. The Weeknd would later deny the accusations and no lawsuits came as a result of the contest.

Charts

Release history

References

2013 singles
2013 songs
The Weeknd songs
Songs written by the Weeknd
Republic Records singles
Songs written by DaHeala
Songs written by Belly (rapper)
Song recordings produced by the Weeknd
Dubstep songs
Canadian synth-pop songs
Sampling controversies